Kisarawe II is an administrative ward in the Temeke district of the Dar es Salaam Region of Tanzania. In 2016 the Tanzania National Bureau of Statistics report there were 10,401 people in the ward, from 8,306 in 2012.

References

Temeke District
Wards of Dar es Salaam Region